Ronald Aaron Wasserman (born September 2, 1961), also known as Aaron Waters and The Mighty Raw, is an American musician who composed the original theme song for Mighty Morphin Power Rangers and numerous original songs he also recorded for the franchise. He is also a member of the band Fisher.

History

Early career
Wasserman has been fascinated with music since he was three years old. His early music bands include Hollywood Headliners Betty Boop & the Beat, formed by SAG actress Lucrecia Sarita Russo. In 1983, (with Wasserman on keyboards) the group opened for Felony/Scotti Brothers records at the Florentine Gardens. Felony was fronted by Lucrecia's then-husband, Jeff Spry, who was receiving chart action with the KROQ-FM hit single "The Fanatic". In the mid-1980s, Ron started a rock band with present-day actress, E.G. Daily. In 1989, shortly after the band disbanded, he started working for Saban Entertainment. Wasserman filled in at Saban Entertainment one afternoon and eventually stayed there for six and a half years. Wasserman and Ron Kenan, once V.P. of Saban Entertainment/Music Production, met in the early 80's and played together in the popular new wave pop band, Betty Boop & the Beat.

Mighty Morphin Power Rangers
While at Saban, Wasserman developed scores and co-wrote themes for several of their smaller series as well as the animated X-Men series, before he composed some of his most recognizable work, which was for the show Mighty Morphin Power Rangers. One day, he was presented with the first footage of the show, was told to use the word "Go", and to have it finished by the next day. After two and a half hours, the song that resulted was the show's theme song, "Go Go Power Rangers".

Several of his most popular songs and scores were eventually released on a successful concept album entitled Mighty Morphin Power Rangers the Album: A Rock Adventure, which linked his music around a variation on the opening episodes of season two of the television series. 

All of his compositions for the Mighty Morphin Power Rangers series and various other Saban productions were credited to Shuki Levy and Kussa Mahchi (Haim Saban). This was so the pair could collect music royalties for Wasserman's work. While working on the show, Saban asked Wasserman to come up with an artist name, as they did not want it to appear as though one person was doing all of the music. He came up with the name "Aaron Waters" because his middle name was Aaron and his surname Wasserman means "water carrier" in German. Saban later attached the additional alias "The Mighty RAW". While the reason behind it is unknown, it is assumed "RAW" is for his initials and "The Mighty" comes from the "Mighty Morphin Power Rangers."

Later Saban projects
Wasserman performed the Power Rangers in Space theme and music. His success with the Power Rangers soundtrack led to work on numerous other projects. Shows he contributed music to around this time include Sweet Valley High and VR Troopers. He was also hired to produce the musical score for FUNimation's first English dub of Dragon Ball Z, which was co-handled by Saban. Wasserman left Saban in September 1995, citing exhaustion.

Post-Saban music career
After leaving Saban, Wasserman started a band with then-girlfriend Kathy Fisher, whom he later married.

Wasserman also began working on various video game titles with Pink Floyd producer, Bob Ezrin and contributed to DIC Entertainment. In 1998, Fisher contributed a song for the movie Great Expectations.

Return to Power Rangers
Wasserman returned to solo work in 2005, and even returned to the Power Rangers franchise in 2005, composing the theme song for the thirteenth Power Rangers season, Power Rangers S.P.D.. News of his involvement reached the fanbase and demo versions of the theme were leaked, upsetting Disney executives. According to Linkara in his "History of Power Rangers" show after contacting Wasserman he also submitted 2 demos for Power Rangers Mystic Force a rock theme and a rap theme, he had first submitted the rock theme and originally the producers at Disney approved of it, but later contacted him saying they were seeking something more of a rap genre thus leading him to creating and submitting a rap theme to them which they in turn rejected, although Wasserman admits that his rap theme wasn't very good. Since Disney were not going to be using the themes for the series he posted the demos online for the fans.

Post Power Rangers
Wasserman remains active with other television and commercial projects, including work for America's Next Top Model.

In 2010, Wasserman released two original songs with Ozone Entertainment as downloadable content on the Rock Band Network.

Power Rangers: Redux

On August 28, 2012, Wasserman announced on both RangerBoard and RangerCrew that he would be re-cutting the original Power Rangers songs, to refresh their sound and use new technology to record them. During the process of recording the tracks, Wasserman posted a few unedited/unmixed sample clips.

Despite being limited to songs that were commercially released on CD or cassette during the 90s, a large repertoire of his Power Rangers music still remained to create the new album. The tracks were released via Bandcamp on October 22, 2012, with CD Baby (covering Amazon, iTunes, etc.) coming thereafter. This new album includes an instrumental version of each song, making it the largest instrumental release of Power Rangers music thus far. A listing of the tracks is as follows:

Personal life
At an early age, Wasserman was adopted by parents of Russian-Jewish descent. His sister was also adopted. As a child, he was often mistaken as being from a different family, since he had blonde hair, while his parents and sister had red hair.

He was formerly married to Kathleen Fisher (the namesake and Wasserman's bandmate in Fisher). They had one son together, Aron, born in 2004.

In September 2018, Wasserman was involved in a mountain bike accident, requiring surgery afterwards.

Discography

Studio albums
 Mighty Morphin Power Rangers the Album: A Rock Adventure (1994) (as Aaron Waters)
 Power Rangers Redux (2012)

Singles
 "Go Go Power Rangers" (1994)
 "American Hero" (2010)
 "Fight Back" (2010)

TV/film composing credits
 X-Men: The Animated Series (1992–1995) Co-composer of the theme song and background music
 Mighty Morphin' Power Rangers (1993–1996) Singer, composer and songwriter of the theme song and background music
 VR Troopers (1994–1996) Co-singer  and composer/songwriter of the background music
 Sweet Valley High (1994–1998) Composer and songwriter of the theme song and background songs
 Space Strikers (1995) Co-composer of the background music
 Teknoman (1995) Composer of theme song and co-composer of the background music
 Power Rangers Zeo (1996) Co-singer, co-composer and co-songwriter
 Dragon Ball Z (1996–1998) Composer of the background music for the original English dub version of the first 53 episodes
 Ace Ventura: The CD-Rom Game (1996) [Video Game]
 Monty Python & the Quest for the Holy Grail (1996) [Video Game]
 Power Rangers Turbo (1997) Co-singer, co-composer and co-songwriter of the background music
 Taylor's Return (1997)
 Dragon Ball Z: The Tree of Might (1997) Composer of the background music for the original English dub version of the film
 Mummies Alive! (1997–1998) Singer-Songwriter of the title song and co-writer of the background music
 Power Rangers in Space (1998) Singer, co-composer and co-songwriter of the theme song and background music
 Great Expectations (1998) Music written and performed by
 America's Next Top Model (2003–2013) Co-composer of the background music
 Trollz (2005–2006) Composer and songwriter
 Power Rangers SPD (2005) Singer, composer and songwriter of the song title
 Dance Revolution (2006–2007) co-composer of the background music
 Horseland (2006–2008)
 Sushi Pack (2007)
 DinoSquad (2007-2008)
 SpongeBob SquarePants (2008) Composer of the background music
 Basketball Wives (2010–2013) Co-composer of the background music
 Hot in Cleveland (2010–2015) Composer of theme and background music
 The Real Housewives of New York City (2011–present)
 All-American Muslim (2011)
 America's Supernanny (2011)
 Retired at 35 (2011) Co-composer of the background music
 7 Days of Sex (2012) Co-composer of the background music
 The Soul Man (2012–2016) Composer of the background music and theme
 Who Do You Think You Are? (2013–present) Co-composer of the background music
 Kirstie (2013–2014) Composer of the background music and theme
 The Thundermans (2014–2018) Composer of the background music
 Bella and the Bulldogs (2015–2016) Composer of the background music
 Criminal Confessions (2017-present) Theme composer and co-composer of score
The Nothing (2018-present) Composer [Video Game]
Murder for Hire (2019-present) Theme composer and co-composer of score

Miscellaneous
 Doctor Strange in the Multiverse of Madness (2022) An orchestrated rendition of Wasserman's X-Men: The Animated Series theme briefly appeared.

References

External links
 Official website
 
 
 
 

Songwriters from California
Living people
1961 births